Margaret's Hope Tea Estate is a tea garden in the Kurseong CD block in the Kurseong subdivision of the Darjeeling district in the Indian state of West Bengal.

Etymology
Margaret, daughter of the owner Cruickshank (alternately Bagdon, according to others) came from England for a visit. She liked the surrounding picturesque settings so much that she promised to come back to the place again. While returning to England, she died on the ship. Her father changed the name of the estate from Ringstrong to Margaret's Hope.

History
Although the tea estate was set up in the 1830s, it became commercially viable in 1864. It was then known as Bara Ringtong. It was named Margaret's Hope Tea Estate in the 1920s. The present factory was built by John Taylor in 1930. The tea estate is now owned by the Goodricke Group.

Geography

Location
Margaret's Hope is in the Northern Valley of Kurseong, very close to the Longview Highlands. The area is popularly referred to as the Land of White Orchids.

Two rivers flow through the estate and a romantic view of the Himalayas forms the backdrop. One can enjoy a view of the panorama from the Tea Deck.

Note: The map alongside presents some of the notable locations in the subdivision. All places marked in the map are linked in the larger full screen map.

Economy
Darjeeling tea from the China tea bushes growing in the misty environment at heights ranging from  has a loyal clientele globally.

The Goodricke Group
The Goodricke Group owns five tea estates in Darjeeling: Thurbo, Badamtam, Barnesbeg, Castleton and Margaret's Hope.

Historic labour movement
Margaret's Hope is considered to be the birthplace of organised labour movement in West Bengal's tea industry. In 1955, a strike, called by Communist Party of India and Akhil Bharatiya Gorkha League, was underway. On 25 June, hundreds of workers had gathered at Margaret's Hope Tea Estate, to register their protest against low wages and denial of facilities by tea garden managements. Six protesters, including two women, were killed in police firing. The furore spilled over and the next day 20,000 workers and common people laid siege of the district headquarters. By 27 June, the management met all the demands of the workers. To take just one example, for the first-time tea garden workers were paid bonus. Although there was provision for payment of bonus under the Bonus Act, till then no tea garden had implemented it. Wages were also raised.

References

External links
 

Tea estates in Darjeeling district